is a small asteroid orbiting near the  of Mars (60 degrees ahead Mars on its orbit). Not only does  orbit on the other side of Mars from other similar asteroids, its spectrum is different as well, which is puzzling because all of the Martian trojans seem to be in very stable orbits.

Orbit 

Physical characteristics 
The long lifetime of the orbits for these asteroids makes the possibility of one or more of them being interlopers unlikely, however. This suggests that either one or more of the Martian trojans was captured in such a way as to give it a long-term stable orbit (and it is therefore not a primordial Martian asteroid), or that some fusion or combination of previous asteroids resulted in the presently observed ones. The Yarkovsky effect may provide a potential capture mechanism but not enough is known about the shapes of these objects to provide a useful Yarkovsky model.

See also 
 5261 Eureka (1990 MB)

References

External links 
 
 

121514
121514
121514
19991030